Hello Again is a 1987 American romantic fantasy-comedy film directed and produced by Frank Perry, written by Susan Isaacs and starring Shelley Long, Judith Ivey, Gabriel Byrne, Corbin Bernsen, Sela Ward, Austin Pendleton, Carrie Nye, Robert Lewis, Madeleine Potter, Thor Fields and Illeana Douglas.

Plot
Long Island housewife Lucy Chadman is in the midst of a tarot card reading by her occult sister, Zelda. Just as Zelda exclaims something is going to happen, Lucy begins to choke to death on a South Korean chicken ball. The film shows the difficulty of Lucy's loved ones, including Zelda, had in coping with her death. But the grief turns to excitement when Zelda receives a book of spells called The Wisdom of Catagonia. Within the book Zelda finds a spell that requires perfect astronomical timing—the moon, the earth, and the dog star must form a perfect isosceles triangle. Zelda performs the spell and Lucy appears.

Lucy begins to reacquaint herself with living and with her family who are shocked to see her alive again, one year later, and soon discovers that she cannot simply pick her life back up where she left off. She returns to find her widower husband has sold their home and married her greedy and double-crossing friend from college. Meanwhile, her son has opened his own successful restaurant and married, instead of going to Columbia.

When she returns to the hospital in which she died, the emergency room doctor who tried to revive her begins to fall for her. Zelda confides in the doctor that if Lucy does not find love by the next full moon, she will have to go back to the spirit world. He does not believe Zelda. Eventually, the press finds out that Lucy came back from the dead, and plague her, her family, and the hospital the ER doctor works at. Her college friend becomes jealous of her media attention and the attention Lucy is getting from Mr. Chadman. She holds a news conference of her own and tells the media Lucy made the whole thing up—claiming that Lucy used tetrodotoxin as a means to fake her own death. Lucy does not defend herself, as she sees this as an opportunity to rid herself and her friends of the media. Instead, the doctor gets fired, her sister's occult store is vandalized and she is hated by almost everyone, except her family. She decides to end the debacle once and for all by tricking her college friend into admitting she lied about Lucy faking her death in front of the media at a party the hospital is having. Lucy, the doctor, and her family walk away happily. As the credits roll, we see that both Lucy and Zelda get married and have children with their new loves. Lucy's son also becomes a father.

Cast
 Shelley Long as Lucy Chadman
 Judith Ivey as Zelda
 Gabriel Byrne as Kevin Scanlon
 Corbin Bernsen as Jason Chadman
 Sela Ward as Kim Lacey
 Austin Pendleton as Junior Lacey
 Carrie Nye as Regina Holt
 Robert Lewis as Phineas Devereaux
 Madeleine Potter as Felicity Glick
 Thor Fields as Danny Chadman
 Kate McGregor-Stewart as Reporter #1

Reception
Hello Again was released theatrically by Touchstone Pictures on November 6, 1987. The film opened at No. 2 at the box office, earning $5,712,892 at its opening weekend. It ultimately grossed $20,419,446 in its entire run.

The film received negative reviews and holds a 10% rating on Rotten Tomatoes from 20 critics.

References

External links
 
 
 
 

1987 films
1980s fantasy comedy films
1987 romantic comedy films
1980s romantic fantasy films
American fantasy comedy films
American romantic comedy films
American romantic fantasy films
Films about death
Films directed by Frank Perry
Films set in Long Island
Films set in New York City
Films shot in New York City
Resurrection in film
Touchstone Pictures films
1980s English-language films
1980s American films